Katrina Scott (born 11 June 2004) is an American tennis player.

Brought up in Woodland Hills, Los Angeles, in 2019 and already 5'11 as a 15 year old, Scott reached the quarter-finals as a wildcard of the junior US Open losing in 3 sets to Oksana Selekhmeteva, and as a qualifier, the round of 16 of 2019 Wimbledon Championships – Girls' singles where she lost in three sets to Emma Navarro. In September 2019, Scott with Robin Montgomery and Connie Ma won the Junior Federation Cup, United States third consecutive win. Scott and Montgomery following in the immediate footsteps of the likes of Amanda Anisimova and Coco Gauff who were part of triumphant teams in the previous years.

Scott made her senior Grand Slam debut at the 2020 US Open at the USTA Billie Jean King National Tennis Center in Flushing Meadow as a wildcard. She defeated Natalia Vikhlyantseva in straight sets to win her first-round match, and took a set off Amanda Anisimova, before losing her second-round match.

Scott got a wildcard for the 2021 Miami Open, but lost in straight sets to Sorana Cirstea in exactly one hour.

Grand Slam singles performance

ITF finals

Singles: 4 (3 titles, 1 runner-up)

References

External links
 
 

American female tennis players
Living people
2004 births
Place of birth missing (living people)
People from Woodland Hills, Los Angeles
American people of Iranian descent
African-American sportswomen
Tennis players from Los Angeles
21st-century African-American sportspeople
21st-century African-American women